Elachista svenssoni is a moth of the family Elachistidae. It is found in Germany, Switzerland, Austria, the Czech Republic, Slovakia and Hungary.

References

svenssoni
Moths described in 1988
Moths of Europe